Duncan Disorderly is a play on the phrase drunk and disorderly. It has been used to refer to:

Duncan Ferguson, Scottish footballer
A character played by Steve Coogan in his early stand-up routines
An episode of Total DramaRama